Arne Månsson (11 November 1925 – 11 January 2003) was a Swedish football defender who played for Sweden in the 1950 FIFA World Cup. He also played for Malmö FF.

References

External links
FIFA profile

Swedish footballers
Sweden international footballers
Association football defenders
Malmö FF players
1950 FIFA World Cup players
1925 births
2003 deaths